

See also
Curule seat

Honor